Calla lily is a common name of several members of the family Araceae. It may refer to:

 Calla palustris
 Zantedeschia generally
 Zantedeschia aethiopica specifically

Araceae genera
Former disambiguation pages converted to set index articles